C. C. Cundiff House, also known as the Cundiff House, is a historic home located near Siloam, Surry County, North Carolina, United States. It was built about 1865, and is a two-story brick dwelling, with a low hipped roof and simple details of vernacular Greek Revival and later Victorian inspiration.  It consists of two sections, one having four rooms and the other two rooms joined by a one-story shed-roofed front porch.  Also on the property are the contributing well/wash house, smokehouse, privy, and family cemetery.

It was listed on the National Register of Historic Places in 1983.

References

Houses on the National Register of Historic Places in North Carolina
Greek Revival houses in North Carolina
Victorian architecture in North Carolina
Houses completed in 1865
Houses in Surry County, North Carolina
National Register of Historic Places in Surry County, North Carolina